The 1994 Boston University Terriers football team was an American football team that represented Boston University as a member of the Yankee Conference during the 1994 NCAA Division I-AA football season.

Schedule

References

Boston University
Boston University Terriers football seasons
Boston University Terriers football